, sometimes written as Zap: Snowboarding Trix, is a snowboarding video game developed by Atelier Double and published by TV Tokyo and Pony Canyon. It was released only for the Sega Saturn, and only in Japan. A sequel to the game, called Zap! Snowboarding Trix '98, was later released both for Saturn and PlayStation (the latter console version internationally) in 1997–1999, under the title Freestyle Boardin' '99 in North America and Phat Air: Extreme Snowboarding in Europe.

Reception

The game received average reviews. Next Generation said, "With only three competitive courses and one freestyle course, there may not be enough to keep the master gamer involved. However, compared to its competition, Cool Boarders, Trix breezes by as a faster, more exciting experience." In Japan, Famitsu gave it a score of 28 out of 40.

Reviews
Absolute Playstation (Oct, 1998)
Absolute Playstation (Apr, 1999)
Computer and Video Games (CVG) (Mar, 1998)
GameSpot (Feb 18, 1999)
Joypad (Jul, 1998)
IGN (Mar 23, 1999)

See also 

 List of Sega Saturn games
 List of snowboarding video games

References

1997 video games
Atelier Double games
Japan-exclusive video games
Pony Canyon games
Sega Saturn games
Sega Saturn-only games
Single-player video games
Snowboarding video games
Video games developed in Japan